The 2011–12 Weber State Wildcats men's basketball team represented Weber State University during the 2011–12 NCAA Division I men's basketball season. The Wildcats, led by sixth year head coach Randy Rahe, played their home games at Dee Events Center and are members of the Big Sky Conference. They finished the season 25–7, 14–2 in Big Sky play to finish in second place. They lost in the championship game of the Big Sky Basketball tournament to Montana. They were invited to the 2012 CollegeInsider.com Tournament where they defeated Utah Valley in the first round before falling to Loyola Marymount in the second round.

Roster

Schedule

|-
!colspan=9 style=| Exhibition

|-
!colspan=9 style=| Regular season

|-
!colspan=9 style=| Big Sky tournament

|-
!colspan=9 style=| [[2012 CollegeInsider.com Postseason tournament]]

NBA Draft

References

Weber State Wildcats men's basketball seasons
Weber State
Weber State
Weber State Wildcats men's basket
Weber State Wildcats men's basket